San Juan School District (SJSD) is a school district headquartered in Blanding, Utah, United States.

The district has twelve schools.  3,193 students were enrolled.

History

As of 2017 teachers in communities of the southern part of the school district (the Bluff, Montezuma Creek, and Oljato–Monument Valley areas) tend to have less experience than those in the northern part of the school district (Blanding, La Sal, and Monticello); about 50% of the teachers to the north have 14 or more years of experience while 7% of teachers in the southern communities have that experience.

Schools
7-12 schools:
 Monticello High School - Monticello
 Monument Valley High School - Oljato–Monument Valley (Unincorporated area)
 San Juan High School - Blanding
 Whitehorse High School - Unincorporated area adjacent to Montezuma Creek

High schools (9-12):
 Navajo Mountain High School - Navajo Mountain (Unincorporated area)

Middle schools (7-8):
 Albert R. Lyman Middle School - Blanding

K-6 schools: 
 Montezuma Creek Elementary School - Aneth (Unincorporated area)
 In 2017 the school offered to give salaries of $80,000 to teachers with many years of experience who are designated as lead teachers.
 Monticello Elementary School - Monticello
 Tsé'bii'nidzisgai Elementary School - Oljato–Monument Valley (Unincorporated area)

1-5 schools:
 Blanding Elementary School - Blanding
 Bluff Elementary School - Bluff (Unincorporated area)

1-3 schools:
 La Sal Elementary School - La Sal (Unincorporated area)

See also

 List of school districts in Utah

References

External links

 

Education in San Juan County, Utah
School districts in Utah